Karl Braunsteiner (27 October 1891 – 19 April 1916) was an Austrian football (soccer) player.

Club career
Regarded as one of the biggest talents of his era, the small defender played for Wiener Sportclub.

During World War I he came to Poland as a gunner. He was captured and died in Tashkent due to typhoid fever as a prisoner of war.

International career
Braunsteiner was a member of the Austrian Olympic squad at the 1912 Summer Olympics and played two matches in the main tournament as well as three matches in the consolation tournament. 

For the Austria national football team he played 8 games.

See also
 List of Olympians killed in World War I

References

External links
WSC profile 

1891 births
1916 deaths
Austrian footballers
Austria international footballers
Olympic footballers of Austria
Footballers at the 1912 Summer Olympics
Austrian prisoners of war
World War I prisoners of war held by Russia

Association football defenders
Wiener Sport-Club players
Deaths from typhoid fever
Austro-Hungarian military personnel killed in World War I
Infectious disease deaths in Uzbekistan